United Nations Security Council resolution 958, adopted unanimously on 19 November 1994, after recalling all resolutions on the situation in the former Yugoslavia including Resolution 836 (1993), the council, acting under Chapter VII of the United Nations Charter, determined that the situation in the former Yugoslavia continued to constitute a threat to international peace and security and in its support of the United Nations Protection Force (UNPROFOR), authorised the use of air strikes in Croatia in addition to Bosnia and Herzegovina by member states, in order for UNPROFOR to carry out its mandate.

See also
 Bosnian War
 Breakup of Yugoslavia
 Croatian War of Independence
 List of United Nations Security Council Resolutions 901 to 1000 (1994–1995)
 Yugoslav Wars

References

External links
 
Text of the Resolution at undocs.org

 0958
 0958
1994 in Yugoslavia
1994 in Bosnia and Herzegovina
1994 in Croatia
 0958
 0958
 0958
November 1994 events